The 1904–05 Haverford Fords men's soccer team represented Haverford College during the 1904–05 IAFL season. It was the Fords fourth season of existence. The Fords competed in the IAFL as well as in the ACCL, and won both the IAFL National Championship, the predecessor to the NCAA Division I Men's Soccer Championship as well as The Manheim Prize, for winning the ACCL.

The Fords became the first team to win an Intercollegiate Soccer Football Association title, which is considered by American soccer historians to be the first formal national championship given to a college soccer program. Haverford finished with six wins, one defeat and three draws.

Roster 
The following players played on Haverford's roster during the 1904–05 season.

 Brown, Paul
 Dickson, Aubrey 
 Lowry, Robert
 Morris, Charles
 Morris, Harold
 Pearson, Henry
 Pearson, Ralph 
 Pleasants Jr., Henry
 Priestman, A.G.
 Reid, David
 Rossmaessler, William
 Spaeth, Reynold
 Spaeth, Sigmund 
 Tatnall, A. G.

Results 

|-
!colspan=6 style="background:#c91631; color:#FFFFFF; border:2px solid #000000;"| Regular season
|-

|-

|-

|-
!colspan=6 style="background:#c91631; color:#FFFFFF; border:2px solid #000000;"| ISFA Championship Series
|-

References

External links 
1904–05 Season Stats

Haverford
1904
1904
1904 in sports in Pennsylvania
1905 in sports in Pennsylvania